Pleurotomella quoniamensis is an extinct species of sea snail, a marine gastropod mollusk in the family Raphitomidae.

Description

Distribution
Fossils of this marine species were found in Eocene strata in Île-de-France, France

References

 Périer (S.), 1941 Contribution à l'étude du Ludien du Bassin de Paris. La faune des marnes à Pholadomya ludensis, p. 1-30
 Furon (R.) & Soyer (R.), 1947 Catalogue des fossiles tertiaires du Bassin de Paris, p. 1-240
 Tucker (J.K.) & Le Renard (J.), 1993 Liste bibliographique des Turridae (Gastropoda, Conacea) du Paléogène de l'Angleterre, de la Belgique et de la France. Cossmanniana, t. 2, vol. 1–2, p. 1-66
 Le Renard (J.) & Pacaud (J.-M.), 1995 Révision des Mollusques paléogènes du Bassin de Paris. 2 - Liste des références primaires des espèces. Cossmanniana, t. 3, vol. 3, p. 65-132 
 Pacaud (J.-M.) & Ledon (D.), 2007 - Sur les espèces de mollusques du Ludien (Priabonien, Éocène supérieur) du bassin de Paris introduites par Périer en 1941. Cossmanniana, t. 11, vol. 1–4, p. 7-25

quoniamensis
Gastropods described in 1941